The women's 45 kilograms competition at the 2022 World Weightlifting Championships was held on 5 December 2022.

Schedule

Medalists

Records

Results

References

Women's 45 kg
World Championships